The Wanderer in Bulgar aka The Minstrel in Bulgar is a 30 minutes Tatar rock opera written and directed by Vladislav Chebitarev, music by Räşid Kalimullin based on İldar Yüziev's libretto for  classical opera Cuckoo's Cry. It was filmed in Kazan Television Studio under Gosteleradio of USSR.

Plot
A group of youngsters visits historical ruins of the Bulgar city, the sacred place of their ancestors. While climbing up and down the ruined towers and minarets The Wanderer begins to see some flashbacks, symbolizing the return to the roots and historical identity. So the journey back to the past and up to the nowadays begins, his every step followed by different musical illustration.

Cast

Main Characters 
Venera Ganieva,
Damir Siraciev as guest,
Alfred Kamilevsky,

Others
Tatar Academic Opera and Ballet Theater Artists:
Vladimir Yakovlev,
Marat Gimatutdinov,
Igor Zhukov,
Konstantin Zakharov,
Alexander Barmin,
Anatoly Petrov,
Ramil Gafiatullin,
Ruald Sidayev,
Ruslan Butayev,
Ilya Migachev,
Nadejda Magdeyeva,
Farida Galeyeva,
Dinara Bikbova,
Kamil Kamalov,
Kamil Fäyzrahmanov,
Dmitry Pivovarov,
Dmitry Rytov,
Alfia Chebotareva,
Zinaida Yakovleva,

Vocals by
Venera Ganieva,
Zölfät Xakim
Damir Siraciev as the guest
Rafael Sähäbiev
Rawil İdrisov
Räşid Kalimullin

Music Performed by
ZMC (Zapiski Mertvogo Cheloveka)
Alexander Ivanov's Band

Choreography by
Vladimir Yakovlev

References and notes

External links

1989 films
1980s musical films
Rock operas
Soviet musical films
Tatar music
Tatar-language films